Johnny Winter is Johnny Winter's second studio album.  Columbia Records released the album in 1969, after signing Winter to the label for a reported $600,000. As with his first album, The Progressive Blues Experiment, Winter mixes some original compositions with songs originally recorded by blues artists.  The album reached number 24 on the Billboard 200 albums chart.

Track listing 
 "I'm Yours & I'm Hers" (Johnny Winter) – 4:27
 "Be Careful with a Fool" (Joe Josea, B. B. King) – 5:15 
 "Dallas" (Johnny Winter) – 2:45 
 "Mean Mistreater" (James Gordon) – 3:53 
 "Leland Mississippi Blues" (Johnny Winter) – 3:19 
 "Good Morning Little School Girl" – (Sonny Boy Williamson) – 2:45 
 "When You Got a Good Friend" (Robert Johnson) – 3:30
 "I'll Drown in My Tears" (Henry Glover) – 4:44 
 "Back Door Friend" (Lightnin' Hopkins, Stan Lewis) – 2:57

2004 reissue bonus tracks
 "Country Girl" (B.B. King) – 3:08
 "Dallas" (Johnny Winter) – 3:37
 "Two Steps from the Blues" (John Riley Brown, Deadric Malone) – 2:35

Personnel
Johnny Winter – lead guitar, slide guitar, harmonica, vocals
"Uncle" John Turner – percussion
Tommy Shannon – bass
Edgar Winter – piano on "I'll Drown in My Tears", alto saxophone on "Good Morning Little School Girl"
Elsie Senter – backing vocals on "I'll Drown in My Tears"
Carrie Hossell – backing vocals on "I'll Drown in My Tears"
Peggy Bowers – backing vocals on "I'll Drown in My Tears"
Stephen Ralph Sefsik – alto saxophone on "I'll Drown in My Tears"
Norman Ray – baritone saxophone on "I'll Drown in My Tears"
Walter "Shakey" Horton – harmonica on "Mean Mistreater"
Willie Dixon – acoustic bass on "Mean Mistreater"
Karl Garvin – trumpet on "Good Morning Little School Girl"
A. Wynn Butler – tenor saxophone on "Good Morning Little School Girl"

Production 
 Johnny Winter – producer
 Eddie Kramer – production consultant
 Marvin Devonish – production assistant
Charlie Bragg, Ed Hudson, Neil Wilburn - engineer
 Steve Paul – spiritual producer

References

Johnny Winter albums
1969 albums
Albums produced by Johnny Winter
Columbia Records albums